"Calm Down" is a song by Nigerian singer Rema, from his debut studio album Rave & Roses (2022). It was released on 11 February 2022, through Jonzing World and Mavin as the album's second single. The song charted across Europe, reaching number one on the Belgian Ultratop 50, Dutch Top 40 and Dutch Single Top 100.

A remix of the song with American singer Selena Gomez was released on 25 August 2022. The new version reached number one on both the Billboard US Afrobeats Songs and the Billboard Global Excl. US charts, and peaked at number three on the Global 200 chart.

Background

On 17 August 2022, Selena Gomez posted a photo of herself and Rema on her social media, captioning it "coming soon". The remix was released a week later.

Composition
The song was described as a "vibey" "feelgood smash hit". Reviewing the remix, Vanguard writer Adegboyega Remmy Adeleye thought Gomez' "melodic tune complements Rema's vibe perfectly, maintaining the same energy as the original release".

Accolades

Charts

Original version

Year-end charts

Selena Gomez remix

Monthly charts

Year-end charts

Certifications

References

2022 singles
2022 songs
Dutch Top 40 number-one singles
Number-one singles in Portugal
Number-one singles in Switzerland
Selena Gomez songs
Ultratop 50 Singles (Wallonia) number-one singles
Billboard Global Excl. U.S. number-one singles